Mary Immaculate College (Coláiste Mhuire gan Smál), also known as MIC and Mary I, is a College of Education and Liberal Arts. Founded in 1898, the university level College of Education and the Liberal Arts is academically linked with the University of Limerick. The college now has a student population of over 5,000 enrolled in undergraduate programmes and a range of postgraduate programmes at Diploma, MA and PhD level. The college has a student retention rate of 95% - one of the highest in Ireland.

Current Developments
MIC has undergone significant growth and development in recent decades with the overall student population witnessing a tenfold increase since 1992. This expansion has brought with it a significant expansion and broadening of MIC's academic provision, as well as a re-development of the campus which now offers teaching, learning and research facilities as well as events and conferencing facilities. In 2016, MIC expanded its geographical footprint following the incorporation of St Patrick's College in Thurles, another well-established college, offering four degree programmes preparing students to become second-level teachers.

As a result of the incorporation of St. Patrick's College, Thurles, MIC is now a multi-campus institution offering 13 undergraduate degree programmes in Education and the Liberal Arts, as well as Continuing Professional Development offerings for teachers and numerous postgraduate opportunities to Masters and PhD level. Also in 2016, a consortium, led by MIC, was awarded the contract from the Higher Education Authority for the delivery of the National Higher Education Programme for Inclusion Coordinators in Early Years Settings.

A December 2020 report noted that Mary Immaculate College had spent €34,140 on investigating sexual harassment, together with €2,152 on legal fees.

Degree Programmes
MIC offers 13 undergraduate degree programmes across both campuses. In 2022 the college announced the launch of a new Bachelor of Science in Psychology (MI003), a unique four-year, full-time, honours degree level 8 programme that will provide students with a comprehensive undergraduate education in psychology and includes learning in the workplace. The programme content will be wide and varied and will prepare graduates for a range of careers while giving them the necessary psychological knowledge to pursue postgraduate studies in psychology.

The Bachelor of Arts (MI002) is a four-year degree programme with three years on campus and one year on work placement and/or study abroad.  The degree is flexible and offers a wide range of familiar subjects to choose from such as English, Geography and History, to newer subjects such as Drama & Theatre Studies, Media & Communication Studies or Psychology. For students interested in drama and theatre practice there is the four-year BA in Contemporary and Applied Theatre Studies (MI001).

On the MIC Thurles Campus there are a number of post-primary teacher education degrees in areas such as Business Studies, Accounting, Gaeilge, Religious Studies and Mathematics. The programmes offered include the BA in Education, Business Studies & Accounting (MI009);BA in Education, Business Studies & Religious Studies (MI010); BA in Education, Gaeilge & Religious Studies (MI011); BA in Education, Gaeilge & Business Studies (MI012); BA in Education, Mathematics & Gaeilge (MI013) and the BA in Education, Mathematics & Business Studies (MI014).

MIC also offers a host of postgraduate programmes to doctoral level in Education and the Liberal Arts, Continuing Professional Development (CPD) courses and numerous access and inclusion pathways. MIC also offers funding supports through a Departmental Assistantships Scheme and merit-based Research Masters and Doctoral Awards Schemes.

Student composition
Close on 10% of students on campus are mature students, a relatively high figure when compared to other third level institutions. The college, in addition to catering for mature students, also offers special entry to disadvantaged students, students with disabilities, refugees, members of ethnic minorities, and Travellers.
MIC also offers Continuing Professional Development (CPD) courses and is committed to improving access to higher education for adults. A range of tailored programmes and supports make the journey for adult learners as easy as possible.

Through its Erasmus and student exchange programmes, the college also has an overseas complement in its student body. Students come from England, Wales, France, Germany, Austria, Switzerland, Spain, Nigeria, Italy, Sudan, Sweden, Finland, Latvia, Poland, Lithuania, China, United States, Indonesia, Norway, Denmark, Ghana, Zimbabwe, and Iceland.

The college has recently expanded into Mount Convent, a former Sisters of Mercy convent on O'Connell Avenue, Limerick, where it houses postgraduate students.

Wired FM
The college is home to a radio station, Wired FM, Limerick's only student radio station with a broadcast licence, run in partnership with another Limerick college, Limerick Institute of Technology.

Lime Tree Theatre
Mary Immaculate College is also the location of the 510-seat theatre known as the Lime Tree Theatre. It was officially opened on 30 October 2012. The venue is host to a wide range of performances, including theatre, music, comedy, traditional arts, schools’ performances, and conferences.

Notable alumni
 Tommy Bulfin, Drama Commissioning Editor BBC
 Cathal Crowe, Politician
 Alphonsus Cullinan, Bishop of Waterford & Lismore
 Jim Daly TD, Fine Gael politician
 John Gunning, sports journalist working in Japan
 Una Healy, member of The Saturdays (left in first year to pursue music career)
 Jacqui Hurley, RTÉ sports presenter
 Tony Killeen, politician
 Micheál Lehane, journalist
 Pat McDonagh, Supermac's founder
 Roisin Meaney, bestselling author
 Madeline Mulqueen, Irish model
 Hildegarde Naughton, Politician
 Síle Ní Chéileachair, short story writer (deceased)
 Patrick O'Donovan, Politician
 Páidí Ó Lionáird, TG4 presenter
 Mary O'Neill, Diplomat
 Dáithí Ó Sé, RTÉ presenter
 Orla O'Shea, former Rose of Tralee
 Máirín Quill, politician

Sports
 Cathal Barrett, Tipperary hurler & All Ireland winner
 Naomi Carroll, field hockey player
 Conor Cooney, Galway hurler and Allstar winner
 Heather Cooney Galway camogie player
 Richie English, Limerick hurler & All Ireland winner
 Mark Foley, former Limerick hurler
 Aaron Gillane, Limerick hurler & All Ireland winner
 Ciara Griffin, former Irish Rugby Captain
 Declan Hannon, Limerick hurler & All Ireland winner
 Séamus Kennedy, Tipperary hurler & All Ireland winner
 Cian Lynch, Limerick hurler & All Ireland winner
 Brendan Maher, Tipperary hurler & All Ireland winner
 Ronan Maher, Tipperary hurler & All Ireland winner
 Shane McGrath, Tipperary hurler and Allstar winner
 Thomas Monaghan, Galway hurler
 Niamh Mulcahy, Limerick camogie player and Allstar winner
 Juliet Murphy, Cork footballer & multiple All Ireland winner
 Dara Ó Cinnéide, former Kerry Gaelic footballer; TG4 presenter
 Darragh O'Donovan, Limerick hurler
 Niall O'Meara, Tipperary hurler & All Ireland winner
 Tomás Ó Sé, former Kerry Gaelic footballer
 David Reidy, Limerick hurler
 Roisin Upton, field hockey player

History

The college was established as a dedicated primary teacher training college for female teachers in 1898 by Bishop Edward Thomas O'Dwyer, Roman Catholic Bishop of Limerick and the Sisters of Mercy.

Its foundation stone was laid on the 8th of December 1898 and the college officially opened in 1902, accepting female students from Munster.

The college accepted male students for the first time in 1969. With a new curriculum in 1971, a number of major changes were initiated with teacher training in Ireland.

1974 saw the commencement of the three year B.Ed. degree with the first graduates in 1977, the course, like in other teacher training colleges, was previously a two-year National Teachers Diploma). From 1974 to 1994, Mary Immaculate College was a recognised college of the National University of Ireland. Due to a drop in the demand for school teachers, in the 1980s under Sr O'Connor and Sr Bulgers presidencies, the college diversified into non-education arts programmes, and began to initiate links with other international universities. Evening programmes were delivered with diplomas in computer studies, catechetics, and philosophy (awarded by NUI).

Following the granting of university status to NIHE Limerick in 1989, Mary Immaculate (as did Thomond College) began talks about a more formal relationship with UL. In 1991, the college became affiliated to the University of Limerick, with new Liberal Arts Programmes being offered by MIC. Degrees were awarded by the NUI until 1994, from 1995 degrees were conferred by UL.

2003 saw the first PhD awarded by Mary Immaculate.

Presidents of Mary Immaculate College
Since its founding in 1898, the Sisters of Mercy presided over the college up until 1999. The term principal was used for the position of head of the college in earlier years.
 Sr. Mary Paul Quinlan (1901–1923) first principal of the college.
 Sr. Mary Veronica (1923-19??) she served as vice-principal to Sr. Quinlan.
 Sr. Loreto (Eileen) O'Connor CSM, BA, HDipEd, MA (1959-1979)
 Sr. M. Cabrini Moloney (Siúr Carbiní Ni Mhaoldomhnaigh) CSM
 Sr. Angela Bulger BA, HDipEd, MA, HonDLitt(1988-1999)
 Prof. Peadar Cremin (1999-2011)
 Prof. Michael A Hayes (2011- 2017)
 Prof. Eugene Wall (2018 to present)

Partner institutions
In addition to institutions throughout Europe, the college exchanges students and staff yearly with the following colleges and universities:
 St. John's University, New York, New York
 Gannon University, Erie, Pennsylvania
 Frostburg State University, Maryland
 Regis University, Denver
 Loyola University, Chicago
 University of St. Thomas, Houston
 Longwood University, Virginia
 Thomas More College, Kentucky
 Salve Regina, Rhode Island
 Le Moyne College, Syracuse, New York
 University of Turku, Turku, Finland
 Australian Catholic University, Melbourne
 Université Blaise Pascal, Clermont-Ferrand, France
 West Chester University, West Chester, Pennsylvania

References

Education in Limerick (city)
Universities and colleges in the Republic of Ireland
University of Limerick
Catholic universities and colleges in the Republic of Ireland
Educational institutions established in 1898
1898 establishments in Ireland
Buildings and structures in Limerick (city)
Association of Catholic Colleges and Universities
Education schools in Ireland